PSN is the PlayStation Network, an online service for Sony PlayStation game consoles.

PSN may also refer to:

Computing
Processor Serial Number, unique to each Intel Pentium III microprocessor
Public Services Network, unified UK government network
Participatory Sensor Network, a sensor network with voluntary participation of users
Packet Switched Network, a digital networking communications method

Transport
Palm Springs (Amtrak station), California, United States, Amtrak station code PSN
Parson Street railway station, England, National Rail station code PSN
Puget Sound Navigation Company, Washington, US

Politics
Partido de la Sociedad Nacionalista, a political party in Mexico
Partido Solidaridad Nacional, a political party in Guatemala
Project Safe Neighborhoods, US DoJ initiative against gun violence

Other uses
Placental site nodule, a benign remnant of a previous pregnancy
 Prime Sports Network, a defunct group of regional sports networks
PSN Ngada, an Indonesian football club
P. S. Narayanaswamy, Indian singer
PT Pasifik Satelit Nusantara (PSN), an Indonesian private company dedicated to telecommunications (PSN-6)